Robert de Bellême ( – after 1130), seigneur de Bellême (or Belèsme), seigneur de Montgomery, viscount of the Hiémois, 3rd Earl of Shrewsbury and Count of Ponthieu, was an Anglo-Norman nobleman, and one of the most prominent figures in the competition for the succession to England and Normandy between the sons of William the Conqueror. He was a member of the powerful House of Bellême.

Robert became notorious for his alleged cruelty. Referring to his activities in the rebellion against Henry I of 1110-1112, the chronicler Orderic Vitalis, in Book XI of his Historia Ecclesiastica, calls Robert "grasping and cruel, an implacable persecutor of the Church of God and the poor ... unequalled for his iniquity in the whole Christian era", as well as "the tyrant who had disturbed the land and was preparing to add still worse crimes to his many offences of plundering and burning". The stories of his brutality may have inspired the legend of Robert the Devil.

Early life

Robert was the oldest surviving son of Roger of Montgomery, 1st Earl of Shrewsbury and Mabel de Bellême, born probably between 1052 and 1056.  In 1070 after the death of his great-uncle Yves Bishop of Séez his parents brought him to Bellême, which at that time became his mother's inheritance, and as the oldest surviving son it would eventually be his.

In 1073 when the Conqueror invaded Maine, Robert was knighted by William at the siege of Fresnai castle. By now probably of age and independent of his father he took part in the 1077 revolt of the young Robert Curthose against Duke William. When Robert's mother, Mabel, was killed , Robert inherited her vast estates. But at this point Duke William took the added precaution of garrisoning the Bellême castles with his own soldiers, which was his ducal right. On hearing the news of William the Conqueror's death in 1087, Robert's first act was to expel the ducal garrisons from all his castles.

Rebellion of 1088

At the end of 1087 Robert Curthose, Duke of Normandy was told of a plot to place him on the throne of England in his brother William II's place, a plot that Duke Robert enthusiastically approved and supported. Robert de Bellême, his brother Hugh de Montgomery and a third brother, either Roger or Arnulf, participated in this rebellion. The main conspirators, however, were Odo of Bayeux, Eustace III, Count of Boulogne, Robert de Mowbray, Geoffrey de Montbray, Earl Roger de Montgomery and other disaffected Magnates. The next year in the Rebellion of 1088, beginning at Easter the rebels burned and wasted the king's properties and those of his followers. At some point Roger of Montgomery detached himself from supporting Robert Curthose through negotiations with the king.

Family and children

Robert married Agnes of Ponthieu, before 9 September 1087, and they had one child:
 
 William III of Ponthieu, who via his mother inherited the county of Ponthieu.

Fictional references
Robert appears as the principal antagonist throughout George Shipway's The Palladin (1973), a fictionalized account of the life of Walter Tirel.

Robert appears as the primary antagonist "Robert of Belesme" in the period romance novels Lady of Fire (1987) and Fire and Steel (1988) by Anita Mills, which take place during the rise of Henry I of England and the events during and after the Battle of Tinchebray, respectively.

He is also portrayed in The Wild Hunt (1990) and The Winter Mantle (2003) by Elizabeth Chadwick.

Robert de Bellême also appears as the protagonist, 'Bellême the Norman Warrior', in a fictionalized account of his life by Roy Stedall-Humphryes, 'Kindle Direct Publishing' 2012.

Notes

References

Shrewsbury, Robert of Belleme, 3rd Earl of
Shrewsbury, Robert of Belleme, 3rd Earl of
11th-century English nobility
12th-century English nobility
Newport, Shropshire
Norman warriors
Shrewsbury, Robert of Belleme, 3rd Earl of
Earls of Shrewsbury
Clan Montgomery